Macromphalia is a genus of moths in the family Lasiocampidae. The genus was erected by father and son entomologists Cajetan and Rudolf Felder in 1874.

Species
Macromphalia affinis Feisthamel, 1839
Macromphalia ancilla Philippi, 1859
Macromphalia canescens
Macromphalia catharina Dognin, 1912
Macromphalia chilensis Felder, 1874
Macromphalia dedecora Feisthamel, 1839
Macromphalia deficiens
Macromphalia felispardalis Ureta, 1957
Macromphalia hypoleuca Philippi, 1859
Macromphalia lojanensis Dognin, 1891
Macromphalia nigrofasciata Ureta, 1957
Macromphalia nitida Butler, 1882
Macromphalia oehrensi Ureta, 1957
Macromphalia purissima Butler, 1882
Macromphalia quindiensis
Macromphalia rivularis Butler, 1882
Macromphalia rubiginea Ureta, 1957
Macromphalia rubrogrisea Philippi, 1863
Macromphalia rufa
Macromphalia rustica Philippi, 1863
Macromphalia spadix Draudt, 1927
Macromphalia valdiviensis Dognin, 1912

External links

Lasiocampidae